Parastu-14, is an Iranian trainer aircraft developed by staff of the logistic-support command repair center of the Islamic Republic of Iran Air Force; which has been added to the IRIAF airforce after passing the preliminary-supplementary related tests.

Unveiling 
Parastu-14 trainer aircraft was introduced during an unveiling ceremony in "Hunting base of Shahid Major General Pilot Hossein Lashgari" in September 2013, and was added to Iran's military air-force. According to the deputy commander of the "Islamic Republic of Iran Air Force"  --Mohsen Darreh Baghi (محسن دره باغی)-- the production of this kind of training-aircraft which are done by using advanced aeronautical technologies, will be continued.

References

2000s Iranian military trainer aircraft